EHC Kloten is an ice hockey team based in the city of Kloten in Switzerland. The team plays in the National League (NL). It has one of the best youth systems in Swiss ice hockey as its youth teams have won 19 championships during the last 50 years. EHC Kloten won four consecutive Swiss championships from 1993 to 1996. They had never been relegated until the 2017–18 season. They returned to the NL following the 2021-22 season.

The team was called the Kloten Flyers between 2000 and 2016.

History
EHC Kloten was founded by a group of seven members, led by Emil Hegner, on December 3, 1934. During the first few years, only exhibition matches were played. The home matches were played on the frozen Nägelimoos-Weiher.

When EHC Kloten began to participate in the championship, they had to start in the lowest league, as usual. In 1941, they were promoted into the Serie B and five years later into the Serie A. One year later, in 1947, the EHC Kloten was promoted into the Swiss League. In 1962, they joined the National League when the league expanded to 10 teams.

In 1967, they became the champions for the first time, headed by their Czech coach Vladimir Kobera.

The team has remained in the highest Swiss league since their promotion and are the longest-serving team in the NL.

For the 1998-99 season the former Russian ice hockey player Vladimir Yurzinov was asked to become the new coach. He introduced a new playing style and encouraged the development and promotion of young players. Even though many people liked this philosophy, the team remained unsuccessful. During the 2003-2004 season, the team reached the playoffs for the first time in their history. A year later, in the 2004-2005 playoffs, they again managed to remain in the highest league. However, this strategy is paying off today.

In October 2004, Yurzinov was released as their coach. He took on a new role as a youth promoter until the end of the season. Yurzinov's successor was former EHC Kloten defenseman Anders Eldebrink and assistant Felix Hollenstein. The new coaching duo managed to get the team back to success and are still in charge of the team.

During the 2008-2009 season, the Flyers swept both HC Geneve-Servette and EV Zug in the playoffs before losing the playoff final against HC Davos in seven games. They finished the regular season in 3rd place.

The club has a well known junior program. There’s a partnership between the Kloten Flyers and the teams of Bülach, Dielsdorf-Niederhasli and Winterthur. Since the founding of the elite-junior league, the teams have won 19 titles, the latest being in the 2005-06 season.

The team's name was reverted from Kloten Flyers to EHC Kloten for the 2016–17 NLA season after the club had been taken over by businessman Hans-Ulrich Lehmann, who bought the organization from the owner group Avenir Sports Entertainment. Pekka Tirkkonen from Finland was appointed new head coach for the 2016–17 season after Sean Simpson had parted company with the club. 
The team had one of the worst attendances of the NL for the 2016–17 season, averaging only 5,229 spectators over their 25 regular season home games. It was also the only team which failed to sell out at least one game during the regular season.

On February 1, 2017, the team won the first Swiss Cup in club history, against Geneve-Servette HC, in a packed Swiss Arena.

The team won the Swiss League title in April 2022 against EHC Olten to gain automatic promotion to the NL.

Honors

Champions
NL Championship (5): 1967, 1993, 1994, 1995, 1996
Swiss Cup (1): 2017
Swiss League (1): 2022

Runners-up
NL Championship (6): 1972, 1987, 1988, 2009, 2011, 2014

Players

Current roster

Honored members

NHL alumni

 Dmitri Afanasenkov
 Bruce Affleck
 Jonas Andersson
 Peter Andersson
 Mark Bell
 Patrice Brisebois
 Aris Brimanis
 Severin Blindenbacher
 Rod Brind'Amour
 Curtis Brown
 Greg Brown
 Brandon Convery
 Tony Currie
 Don Dietrich
 Micki DuPont
 Murray Eaves
 Anders Eldebrink
 Brian Felsner
 Martin Gerber
 Alexandre Giroux
 Erik Gustafsson
 Kari Haakana
 Jeff Halpern
 Radek Hamr
 Timo Helbling
 Chris Herperger
 Bob Hess
 Glenn Hicks
 Jaroslav Hlinka
 Peter Ihnacak
 Calle Johansson
 Bernie Johnston
 Olli Jokinen
 Marko Kiprusoff
 Chad Kolarik
 Chris Kontos
 Kamil Kreps
 Scott Lachance
 Brooks Laich
 Gary Lupul
 Rick MacLeish
 Kris Manery
 Bill McDougall
 Bob Mongrain
 Peter Mueller
 Brady Murray
 Kent Nilsson
 Niklas Nordgren
 Mark Olver
 Chris O'Sullivan
 Lasse Pirjetä
 Domenico Pittis
 Vojtech Polak
 Jame Pollock
 Paul Ranger
 Shawn Rivers
 Deron Quint
 Tommi Santala
 James Sheppard
 Gordon Sherven
 Tommy Sjödin
 Tobias Stephan
 David Tanabe
 Chris Tancill
 Claude Verret
 Roman Wick
 Brian Willsie
 Ron Wilson
 Ross Yates

Notable coaches
Vladimir Kobera, champion 1967
Conny Evensson, champion 1993, 1994
Alpo Suhonen, champion 1995, 1996

References

External links
 Official Website of the Kloten Flyers
 Unity Kloten

Ice hockey teams in Switzerland
Kloten
Ice hockey clubs established in 1934
Swiss Women's League teams